Roy Eric Brown (born 5 October 1945) is an English former professional footballer who played for Tottenham Hotspur, Reading, Notts County and Mansfield Town.

Playing career
Brown joined Tottenham Hotspur as an amateur in September 1961 and was signed professionally in October 1962. As goalkeeper he played one first team match in 1966 for the Spurs at White Hart Lane in a 3-1 reverse against Blackpool on 15 October 1966. However, Brown made 250 appearances at various levels in his time with the club. Brown signed for Reading in July 1968 and featured in 63 matches. In July 1970 he transferred to Notts County where he went on to make a further 113 appearances before joining Mansfield Town in November 1975 where he made one senior appearance.

Post-football career
Brown held the position of Sports Centre manager in Newark-on-Trent, Watford and Reading before becoming Head of Leisure for Reading Borough Council, a post he held between 1975 and 1999. In addition he was secretary of the Reading Golf club and later held the same position at Ham Manor Golf Club, Angmering, Sussex.

References

External links
 

1945 births
People from Shoreham-by-Sea
Association football goalkeepers
English footballers
English Football League players
Tottenham Hotspur F.C. players
Reading F.C. players
Notts County F.C. players
Mansfield Town F.C. players
Living people